The Minister of Reconstruction and Urban Development was a French cabinet position established after World War II (1939–1945).

Officeholders

References

Sources

Government ministries of France